Anoplocurius altus is a species of beetle in the family Cerambycidae. It was described by Knull in 1942.

References

Elaphidiini
Beetles described in 1942